St John the Evangelist, Havering-atte-Bower is a Church of England religious building in the village of Havering-atte-Bower, an outlying settlement of the London Borough of Havering.

History
The church sits on the site of the chapel dedicated to St Mary that was part of the Havering Palace. The chapel was demolished in 1876.

References

Church of England church buildings in the London Borough of Havering
History of the London Borough of Havering